Pilosella is a genus of flowering plants in the family Asteraceae. Some sources include it within the genus Hieracium.

Species
, Plants of the World Online accepted the following species:

Pilosella abakurae 
Pilosella acutifolia 
Pilosella adenocantabrica 
Pilosella adenogaliciana 
Pilosella aiboensis 
Pilosella aletschensis 
Pilosella alpicola 
Pilosella alturgelliana 
Pilosella amaurocephala 
Pilosella anchusoides 
Pilosella aneimena 
Pilosella anobrachia 
Pilosella aranii 
Pilosella arbasiana 
Pilosella argyrocoma 
Pilosella argyrogaliciana 
Pilosella argyrolegionensis 
Pilosella arida 
Pilosella arnoseroides 
Pilosella aurantella 
Pilosella aurantiaca 
Pilosella auriculiformis 
Pilosella auriculoides 
Pilosella balansae 
Pilosella basifurca 
Pilosella bauhini 
Pilosella biflora 
Pilosella × bifurca 
Pilosella biglana 
Pilosella billyana 
Pilosella blaui 
Pilosella blyttiana 
Pilosella bodewigiana 
Pilosella bonaquae 
Pilosella brachiata 
Pilosella brachycoma 
Pilosella breviscapa 
Pilosella bryhnii 
Pilosella brzovecensis 
Pilosella budensis 
Pilosella bulgarica 
Pilosella × byzantina 
Pilosella caballeroi 
Pilosella caespitosa 
Pilosella calodon 
Pilosella calomastix 
Pilosella capillata 
Pilosella castellana 
Pilosella caucasica 
Pilosella cernua 
Pilosella × chaetocephala 
Pilosella chaetophyton 
Pilosella cinereiformis 
Pilosella cinerosiformis 
Pilosella cochlearis 
Pilosella corymbulifera 
Pilosella corymbuloides 
Pilosella crassiseta 
Pilosella cymiflora 
Pilosella cymosa 
Pilosella czerepninii 
Pilosella densiflora 
Pilosella × derubella 
Pilosella × deschatresii 
Pilosella dichotoma 
Pilosella dimorphoides 
Pilosella dubia 
Pilosella dublitzkii 
Pilosella × dutartrei 
Pilosella echioides 
Pilosella eglandulosa 
Pilosella eminens 
Pilosella erythrochrista 
Pilosella erythrodonta 
Pilosella euchaetia 
Pilosella euchaetiiformis 
Pilosella fainensis 
Pilosella fallacina 
Pilosella fallax 
Pilosella faurei 
Pilosella flagellaris 
Pilosella floribunda 
Pilosella fontqueri 
Pilosella frigidaria 
Pilosella fuernrohrii 
Pilosella fulviseta 
Pilosella fusca 
Pilosella × fuscoatra 
Pilosella galliciana 
Pilosella glacialis 
Pilosella glomerata 
Pilosella grossheimii 
Pilosella × gudarica 
Pilosella guthnikiana 
Pilosella halacsyi 
Pilosella × heterodoxa 
Pilosella heterodoxiformis 
Pilosella heterogaliciana 
Pilosella heteromelana 
Pilosella hirtocastellana 
Pilosella hoppeana 
Pilosella hybrida 
Pilosella hyperborea 
Pilosella hypeurocinerea 
Pilosella hypeurya 
Pilosella hypeurygenes 
Pilosella hypoleuca 
Pilosella iberoatlantica 
Pilosella ilgazensis 
Pilosella iserana 
Pilosella katunensis 
Pilosella kebeshensis 
Pilosella koernickeana 
Pilosella kozlowskyana 
Pilosella kumbelica 
Pilosella lactocantabrica 
Pilosella lactucella 
Pilosella laggeri 
Pilosella lamprocantabrica 
Pilosella lamprocoma 
Pilosella lamprogaliciana 
Pilosella lathraea 
Pilosella legiogudarica 
Pilosella legionensis 
Pilosella legiotremedalis 
Pilosella leptadeniiformis 
Pilosella leptoclados 
Pilosella leptophyton 
Pilosella leucopsilon 
Pilosella levieri 
Pilosella litardiereana 
Pilosella longisquama 
Pilosella lydiae 
Pilosella macranthela 
Pilosella macranthiformis 
Pilosella macrostolona 
Pilosella macrotricha 
Pilosella macutensis 
Pilosella mampodrensis 
Pilosella maraniana 
Pilosella × maschukensis 
Pilosella massagetovii 
Pilosella mayeri 
Pilosella medioposita 
Pilosella megargyrocoma 
Pilosella megatricha 
Pilosella × melinomelas 
Pilosella merxmuelleriana 
Pilosella moechiadia 
Pilosella montiberica 
Pilosella muscelii 
Pilosella neogelmii 
Pilosella neotremedalis 
Pilosella nevadensis 
Pilosella nigrogudarica 
Pilosella nigrolegionensis 
Pilosella niveocantabrica 
Pilosella niveocastellana 
Pilosella niveogaliciana 
Pilosella noguerensis 
Pilosella norrliniiformis 
Pilosella notha 
Pilosella novosibirskensis 
Pilosella occidentalis 
Pilosella officinarum 
Pilosella onegensis 
Pilosella oroasturica 
Pilosella orogaliciana 
Pilosella orolegionensis 
Pilosella pachycymigera 
Pilosella pachypilon 
Pilosella pannoniciformis 
Pilosella panticosae 
Pilosella paragoga 
Pilosella paragogiformis 
Pilosella pavichii 
Pilosella pavichiodes 
Pilosella × pawlowskiellum 
Pilosella peleteriana 
Pilosella permutata 
Pilosella petraea 
Pilosella pieriana 
Pilosella piloselliflora 
Pilosella pilosellina 
Pilosella piloselloides 
Pilosella pinea 
Pilosella pintodasilva 
Pilosella plaicensis 
Pilosella polioderma 
Pilosella × polymastix 
Pilosella portae 
Pilosella procera 
Pilosella procerigena 
Pilosella × promeces 
Pilosella prussica 
Pilosella pseudofidalgoana 
Pilosella pseudogalliciana 
Pilosella pseudogudarica 
Pilosella × pseudolactucella 
Pilosella pseudomaraniana 
Pilosella pseudopanticosae 
Pilosella pseudopilosella 
Pilosella pseudosulphurea 
Pilosella pseudotrichodes 
Pilosella pseudovahlii 
Pilosella puenteana 
Pilosella rhenovulcanica 
Pilosella rhodopea 
Pilosella ricoana 
Pilosella rothiana 
Pilosella × rubra 
Pilosella ruprechtii 
Pilosella sabinopsis 
Pilosella salernicola 
Pilosella samokoviensis 
Pilosella saussureoides 
Pilosella scandinavica 
Pilosella schelkownikovii 
Pilosella × schizosciadia 
Pilosella schneidii 
Pilosella schultesii 
Pilosella × sciadogena 
Pilosella sedelmeyeriana 
Pilosella segoviensis 
Pilosella serbica 
Pilosella setifolia 
Pilosella sintenisii 
Pilosella solacolui 
Pilosella soleiroliana 
Pilosella stenosoma 
Pilosella sterrochaetia 
Pilosella stoloniflora 
Pilosella subdecolorans 
Pilosella subgudarica 
Pilosella subrubens 
Pilosella substoloniflora 
Pilosella subtardans 
Pilosella subulatissima 
Pilosella sulphurea 
Pilosella × tambovica 
Pilosella tardiuscula 
Pilosella tardogaliciana 
Pilosella tendina 
Pilosella tephrocephala 
Pilosella tephrochlorella 
Pilosella tephrodes 
Pilosella tephroglauca 
Pilosella tephrophyton 
Pilosella tinctilingua 
Pilosella tjumentzevii 
Pilosella transbotnica 
Pilosella × tremedalis 
Pilosella tricholepia 
Pilosella trigenes 
Pilosella triplex 
Pilosella tubulascens 
Pilosella turolensis 
Pilosella ullepitschii 
Pilosella unamunoi 
Pilosella universitatis 
Pilosella vahlii 
Pilosella vansoestii 
Pilosella × variifurca 
Pilosella velutina 
Pilosella verruculata 
Pilosella × viridifolia 
Pilosella visianii 
Pilosella walteri-langii 
Pilosella willingorum 
Pilosella wolgensis 
Pilosella woronowiana 
Pilosella xilocae 
Pilosella ziziana

References

 
Asteraceae genera